The Trieb is a river of Saxony, Germany and a right-hand tributary of the White Elster.

See also
List of rivers of Saxony

References 

Rivers of Saxony
Rivers of Germany